George Post Wheeler (August 6, 1869 – December 23, 1956) was an American journalist, writer and career diplomat.

Biography
He was born on August 6, 1869, in Owego, New York. His parents were Rev. Henry Wheeler and Mary Sparkes Wheeler.

Wheeler was a foreign correspondent in Paris and Morocco following his graduation from Princeton University in 1891. He passed the first examinations given in 1906 for the United States Foreign Service and went on to serve as a career diplomat between 1906 and 1934.

Wheeler married the novelist Hallie Erminie Rives in 1906 in Tokyo. A wedding announcement noted that Wheeler initially considered the Kentucky-born Rives "rather severe on men" in her books and she considered him "none too charitable concerning the faults of women" in his book Reflections of a Bachelor. They met at a reception in New York and began a friendship that eventually led to marriage.

He was the second secretary of the United States legation to Japan between 1906 and 1909; served at the American Embassy in Saint Petersburg, Russia between 1906 and 1911 and at the American Embassy in Rome between 1912 and 1913. He returned to Japan as Charge d'Affairs between 1914 and 1916 and was later counselor at the American Embassy in Tokyo. He went on to serve on the American Legation in Stockholm, Sweden between 1917 and 1920; in London between 1921 and 1924; and in Rio de Janeiro in 1929. He was envoy extraordinary and minister plenipotentiary to Paraguay between 1929 and 1933 and to Albania between 1933 and 1934.

He died on Christmas Eve, December 23, 1956 at the Frances Convalescent Home in Neptune, New Jersey. His age was 87 years.

Legacy
Wheeler published a number of books and short pieces over his lifetime, including works of poetry and humor, as well as collections of Russian, Albanian, and Hawaiian folklore.  He also collected a number of Japanese rakugo tales to be published in a ten-volume work entitled Hō-Dan-Zō (Treasure-Tale Storehouse), but the work was never published due to the United States' entry into World War II.  The manuscript now resides in the New York Public Library. He and his wife wrote Dome of Many-Coloured Glass in 1952 about their experiences serving in the United States Foreign Service.

References

1869 births
1956 deaths
American male journalists
American memoirists
Ambassadors of the United States to Albania
People from Neptune Township, New Jersey
United States Foreign Service personnel
People from Oswego, New York
20th-century American diplomats